Benjamin Waugh (20 February 183911 March 1908) was a Victorian social reformer and campaigner who founded the UK charity, the National Society for the Prevention of Cruelty to Children (NSPCC) in the late 19th century, and also wrote various hymns.

Early life
Waugh was born, the son of a saddler, in Settle, West Riding of Yorkshire, and attended theological college in Bradford before moving to Newbury, Berkshire, and then in 1866 to London.

Career
Working as a Congregationalist minister in the slums of Greenwich, Waugh became appalled at the deprivations and cruelties suffered by children. Critical of the workhouse system, the Poor law and aspects of the criminal justice system as it affected children, he wrote a book (The Gaol Cradle, Who Rocks It?, 1873) urging the creation of juvenile courts and children's prisons as a means of diverting children from a life of crime. He was elected to represent Greenwich on the London School Board from 1870 to 1876.

He was also, from 1874 to 1896, editor of a religious periodical, The Sunday Magazine, in which he published several of his own hymns, among which is "Now let us see thy beauty, Lord", which has appeared in several editions of the Methodist Hymn Book, in Congregational Praise and in the Australian Hymnbook, though not in its successor, Sing Alleluia.

London Society for the Prevention of Cruelty to Children
In 1884, he was a co-founder (with Sarah Smith, Lady Burdett-Coutts, Lord Shaftesbury and others) of the London Society for the Prevention of Cruelty to Children (echoing a similar initiative in Liverpool), launched at London's Mansion House on 8 July. The London body's first chairman was veteran social reformer, Earl Shaftesbury. It evolved to become the NSPCC some five years later (14 May 1889), with Waugh as its first director and Queen Victoria as its first patron.

Family and homes
With his wife Sarah Elizabeth, Waugh had twelve children including daughters Edna, who would become a notable watercolour artist and draughtsman, and Rosa, who would follow in his footsteps as a social campaigner.

Waugh lived at a number of addresses including Oak Cottage, Shipbourne in Kent, Croom's Hill in Greenwich, and at 53 Woodlands Villas (today Vanbrugh Park) in neighbouring Blackheath. In 1884 he was living at 33 The Green, Southgate. He later retired, in 1905, to live at 4 Runwell Terrace in Westcliff, a suburb of Southend, Essex, where he died three years later, and was buried in the Southend borough cemetery.

A blue plaque marks a property mistakenly believed to be that of Waugh's residence on Croom's Hill when it was installed in 1984 by the Greater London Council. English Heritage, the successor authority responsible for blue plaques correctly identifies Waugh's former home as 62 Croom's Hill.

Gallery

References

External links
 
 

1839 births
1908 deaths
People from Settle, North Yorkshire
English Christian religious leaders
English Congregationalists
English philanthropists
Members of the London School Board
British reformers
British social reformers
National Society for the Prevention of Cruelty to Children people
19th-century British philanthropists
Burials in Essex